This is a list of commercial banks in Mali:

 Banque Internationale pour le Commerce et l'Industrie au Mali	
 Banque Malienne de Solidarité	
 Bank of Africa - Mali	
 Banque Atlantique Mali
 Banque Régionale de Solidarité-Mali	
 Banque Commerciale du Sahel		
 Banque Internationale pour le Mali
 Banque du Développement du Mali (BDM) (Mali Development Bank)
 Banque Nationale de Développement Agricole (BNDA) (National Agricultural Development Bank)	
 Ecobank Mali	
 Banque Sahélo-Saharienne pour l'Investissement et le Commerce (BSSIC)
 UBA Mali

External links
Website of Central Bank of West African States (English)
 Challenges in Agricultural Financing in Mali

See also
 List of banks in Africa
 Economy of Mali

References

 
Banks
Mali
Mali